Pam Withers was born on July 31, 1956. She's an American-born Canadian author of outdoor adventure and sports novels for young adults as well as being a former journalist and editor. She is a former whitewater kayak racer and instructor and whitewater raft guide.

Pam Withers grew up in the American Midwest, edited a kayak magazine in California, and did further editing work in Seattle and New York City. She has also lived in England and Ireland. She lives in Vancouver, British Columbia, Canada with her husband, a university professor, and travels extensively in Canada and the United States on speaking engagements.

Awards
Three of her books First Descent, Stowaway, Tracker's Canyon) have been nominated for a Red Maple Award (Ontario Library Association), and First Descent received a Silver Nautilus award in 2012.

Bibliography
Drone Chase (2021)
The Parkour Club (2020)
Stowaway (2018)
Tracker's Canyon (2017)
Bungee Jump (2016)
Paintball Island (2014)
Jumpstarting Boys: How to Help Your Underachiever (with Cynthia Gill) (2013)
Andreo's Race (2015)
First Descent (2011)
Going Vertical: The Life of an Extreme Kayaker (with Tao Berman) (2008)
Daredevil Club (2006)
Camp Wild (2005)
Breathless (2005)

Take It to the Xtreme
Mountainboard Maniacs (2008)
BMX Tunnel Run (2007)
Wake's Edge (2007)
Dirtbike Daredevils (2006)
Vertical Limits (2005)
Surf Zone (2005)
Skater Stuntboys (2005)
Adrenalin Ride (2005)
Peak Survival (2004)
Raging River (2003)

References

External links

Living people
1956 births
Canadian women novelists
Canadian writers of young adult literature
Kayakers
Women writers of young adult literature